Iván Moreno y Fabianesi (born 4 June 1979) is a Spanish-Argentine retired footballer.

Early life
He was born in Badajoz, Spain, the third child of a Spanish father, Ignacio Pedro Moreno Carballo (a professional footballer), and an Argentine mother. As a child, Moreno lived in Spain and Argentina following his parents' multiple relocations.

Playing career
Moreno y Fabianesi made his professional debut for Rosario Central on 18 October 1998 in a 1–1 away draw against Independiente. During his stint with Rosario Central he claimed his Argentine citizenship right, to avoid filling up a "foreigner" slot in Argentine clubs. When drafted by then-coach José Pekerman to the Argentine under-20 team, Moreno accepted, thus preempting any eventual call to the Spain national football team.

Moreno's career in Spain had little success. During his tenure with Villarreal CF, he played mostly with the Onda farm team. He was more successful in Mexico, to the point that Argentina's Vélez Sársfield brought him to fulfill a key slot in midfield. After a modest success under coach Ricardo LaVolpe, Moreno was transferred in June 2007 to Estudiantes de La Plata, where he played as a creative midfielder, mostly on the right, while helping Rodrigo Braña in the defensive department. After a brief return to Rosario Central, in 2009 he played for Greek side Skoda Xanthi, but he returned to Argentina after only 8 games in Greece to sign for Cólon.

In January 2014, he signed a new contract with Uruguayan side Liverpool.

Nickname
In Argentina, he is known as the "Torero (bullfighter)" because of his signature goal celebration, imitating a matador's pass, which was conceived to dedicate the goal to his parents in Spain.

References

External links
 Argentine Primera statistics
 Nota sobre Iván Moreno en Mundo Deportivo
 Artículo sobre su conflicto en Colón 
 Nota tras su incorporación a Vélez

1979 births
Living people
Sportspeople from Badajoz
Footballers from Extremadura
Spanish people of Argentine descent
Citizens of Argentina through descent
Spanish footballers
Spanish expatriate footballers
Argentine Primera División players
Rosario Central footballers
La Liga players
Villarreal CF players
Expatriate footballers in Portugal
Primeira Liga players
FC Porto players
FC Porto B players
Club Atlético Banfield footballers
Club Atlético Colón footballers
Expatriate footballers in Mexico
Liga MX players
Atlético Morelia players
Club Atlético Vélez Sarsfield footballers
Estudiantes de La Plata footballers
Expatriate footballers in Uruguay
Liverpool F.C. (Montevideo) players
Expatriate footballers in Greece
Super League Greece players
Xanthi F.C. players
Association football midfielders
Argentine footballers
Argentine people of Spanish descent
Spanish emigrants to Argentina
Spanish expatriate sportspeople in Greece
Spanish expatriate sportspeople in Mexico
Spanish expatriate sportspeople in Portugal
Argentine expatriate sportspeople in Uruguay